Kolambugan, officially the Municipality of Kolambugan, is a 4th class municipality in the province of Lanao del Norte, Philippines. According to the 2020 census, it has a population of 28,265 people.

Etymology
The name “Kolambugan” was taken from the word “kolambog”, a kind of tree which grew abundantly in the area. Some present day barangays were also called Migcamiguing and Maribojoc before, named also from trees of the same names which were found abundantly in the area.

Geography

It is centrally located north-west in the province of Lanao del Norte. The Municipality of Kolambugan is bound by the Panguil Bay on the north, Municipality of Magsaysay on the south; the Municipality of Maigo on the east; and the Municipality of Tubod on the west.

Barangays

Kolambugan is politically subdivided into 26 barangays.

Climate

History
Originally and before the Spanish and later American Invasions, majority of the people living in Kolambugan belonged to the Maranao Tribe.
According to folk stories from the old leaders of Kolambugan during the Spanish occupation, some of the leaders from the interior areas of Lanao del Norte usually crossed the beach of the municipality of Kolambugan to the beach of Ozamis City by boat. These leaders did this to catch people living in the other side of the bay and make those people as worker (personal helper). In Maranaw term, these workers/personal helpers were called BISAYA.

There was also a story that one of the families in Kolambugan, the Mutia Families from Zamboanga del Norte and Misamis Occidental,  originally came from the Interior area of Lanao del Norte and even at present, this story still exists because according to the tale, the great-great-great of the Mutia Families once lifted a small book hanging in the center of their house and said to the children it is forbidden to open the book, or even to touch it, and according to the story, when after many years have passed and somebody dared to open the book, they saw unfamiliar writings in the book (Spanish and English languages), and some said that the writings also looked like Arabic letters.

After a long social process, sometime in 1935 – 1944, under the National Land Settlement Administration (NLSA) of the Commonwealth Government, there was a Philippine House of Representative proposal to invade the Island of Mindanao so that some parts of Mindanao can be used to help the Philippine Government. Not everyone was agreeable to this proposal and one of the oppositions during that time was Congressman Datu Salipada Khalid Pendatun. However, said proposal was approved and signed by then President Manuel L. Quezon who was the president of that time. The settlers were composed of people who have knowledge about skilled jobs, Agri Technology, Engineering, and Farming. The settlers came from the islands of Luzon and Visayas and they brought with them knowledge and experience of Agriculture, Technical, Farming, Lumber, Carpenter etc. The first batch transport were landed to the following Areas:
•	Some parts of Zamboanga
•	Misamis Occidental
•	Lanao Del Norte
•	Misamis Oriental
•	Some part of Surigao
•	Some part of Davao
•	Some Part of Cotabato

In Lanao del Norte, the transport of settlers was peacefully successful due to the smooth negotiations with the Maranao Tribal Leaders and Land Lords. As Welcome sign, the Land lords has donate piece of land (piece of land before are more than 5 hectares) to start the settlers life as beginning of life. In long run and process, the family of settler works to the land owners and as a gift since they are very good workers, the land lord gave the small piece of land as a gift. Some say that, settlers trade they made the business to the land lord just few item exchange of lands. Some family of land lords marry the daughter of their workers which result and until the majority living in Lanao del Norte and Misamis Occidental has blood in Maranao Tribe (Muslim Blood).

Executive Order No. 37, s. 1936, signed on June 4, 1936, prompted the organization of the municipal districts of Kolambugan and Buruun into an independent municipality.

On July 1, 1936, by virtue and power of the Executive Order No. 37, President Manuel L. Quezon declared Kolambugan as one of the Municipalities of Lanao Province. The Lanao province was further divided into Lanao del Norte and Lanao del Sur. Kolambugan is part of Lanao del Norte province.

In 1956, the barrios of Tangcal, Berowar, Pangao, Tawinian, Lumbac, Lawigadato, Somyorang, Bayabao, Pilingkingan, Ramain, Bagigicon, Lamaosa, Meladoc Big and Meladoc Small and Rarab, then part of Kolambugan was constituted into the municipal district of Tangcal.

Formerly the largest town in the province, the following towns/barrios were separated from Kolambugan:
 Tubod (October 17, 1946)
 Lala (March 22, 1949)
 Baroy (June 10, 1949, note that according to the act, additional land was to be given to Tubod and Baroy)
 Salvador (January 13, 1960)
 Bacolod (May 10, 1956)
 Tangcal (June 16, 1956, as a Mun District)
 Maigo [with Bacolod] (February 27, 1959)
 Magsaysay [with Tubod, Tangcal] (March 22, 1960, as a Mun District)

Name of Barangays from Maranao Tribe Terms
On the hand, the settlement has going problem and conflict between Non-Muslim and Muslim when Martial Law is implemented.

Demographics

Economy

Government
Mayors after People Power Revolution 1986:
{{columns-list|colwidth=30em|
 1986 - 1989, Ursecio Ridao
 1989 - 1992, Ursecio Ridao
 1992 - 1995, Ursecio Ridao
 1995 - 1998, 
 1998 - 2001, Angelito Enriquez
 2001 - 2002,  Dr. Gregorio Z. Cardona Sr. (deceased)
2002-2004,  Bertrand M. Lumaque
 2004 - 2007,  Bertrand M. Lumaque
 2007 - 2010,  Bertrand M.  Lumaque
 2010 - 2013,  Bertrand M. Lumaque
 2013 - 2016, Lorenzo V. Manigos
 2016 - 2019, Lorenzo V. Manigos
 2019 - July 1, 2022, Lorenzo V. Manigos
 July 1, 2022 - present, Allan M. Omamos

Vice Mayors after People Power Revolution 1986:

References

External links

 Kolambugan Profile at the DTI Cities and Municipalities Competitive Index
 [ Philippine Standard Geographic Code]
Philippine Census Information
Official site of Kolambugan
Local Governance Performance Management System

Municipalities of Lanao del Norte
Establishments by Philippine executive order